El Tigre Airport  is an airport serving El Tigre, a town in the state of Anzoátegui in Venezuela.

See also 

Transport in Venezuela
List of airports in Venezuela
San Tomé Airport

References

External links 
OpenStreetMap - El Tigre

Airports in Venezuela
Buildings and structures in Anzoátegui
El Tigre